Oru Njayarazhcha (English: A Sunday) is a 2019 Malayalam language drama film written, composed and directed by Shyamaprasad. It stars Murali Chand, Satheesh Kumar, Megha Thomas, Ramesh Verma and Sally Verma in pivotal roles. The film is based on two Bengali short stories written by Shirshendu Mukhopadhyay and Dibyendu Palit respectively.

It won the Kerala State Film Award for Second Best Film, along with the best editor for Aravind and best director for Shyamaprasad at the same ceremony. It was screened at the 2019 International Film Festival of Kerala and was released theatrically on 13 December 2019.

Cast
Murali Chand as Ajith
Satheesh Kumar as Devdas
Megha Thomas as Suja
Sally Varma as Sujatha

Reception
Neelima Menon of The News Minute called the film Shyamaprasad's "most unassuming work till date, with a short film tone, frames stark and ordinary and actors fresh and raw." CS Venkiteswaran of Film Companion wrote: "What makes viewing this film a riveting experience is the way in which the narrative meanders and weaves together events happening in one single day–A Sunday–in the life of two couples, all of them in love with someone outside marriage."

References

External links

Films directed by Shyamaprasad
Indian romantic drama films
Films based on short fiction
2010s Malayalam-language films
2019 romantic drama films